Carlo Tacchini (born 25 January 1995) is an Italian sprint canoeist. He competed in the men's C-1 1000 metres and in the men's C-1 200 metres event at the 2016 Summer Olympics.

References

External links
 

1995 births
Living people
Italian male canoeists
Olympic canoeists of Italy
Canoeists at the 2016 Summer Olympics
People from Verbania
ICF Canoe Sprint World Championships medalists in Canadian
European Games competitors for Italy
Canoeists at the 2019 European Games
Canoeists of Fiamme Oro
Sportspeople from the Province of Verbano-Cusio-Ossola
21st-century Italian people